Rolfosteus is an extinct monospecific genus of arthrodire placoderm from the Early Frasnian stage of the Late Devonian period, found at the Gogo Formation of Western Australia.

Description
Rolfosteus had a skull reaching , with tough plating on the front of its body. Like other arthrodires, such as Coccosteus and the giant Dunkleosteus, it had sharp, bony plates on its mouth which formed a turtle-like beak for cutting prey to pieces. Rolfosteus'''s most unusual feature was its highly elongated rostrum (snout), which may have been used to enhance its sense of smell as well as increase its hydrodynamic streamlining, making it well adapted to be a pelagic pursuit predator. Its fast jaw movement and jaw morphology allowed it to effectively capture prey and swallow them whole.

PhylogenyRolfosteus is a member of the family Camuropiscidae under the superfamily Incisoscutoidea, which belongs to the clade Coccosteomorphi, one of the two major clades within Eubrachythoraci. The cladogram below shows the phylogeny of Rolfosteus'':

References

Further reading
 Long, John A. The Rise of Fishes: 500 Million Years of Evolution Baltimore: The Johns Hopkins University Press, 1996.  

Camuropiscidae
Devonian animals of Australia
Late Devonian fish
Fossils of Australia
Fossil taxa described in 1979